Sandra Deel may refer to:

 Sandra Deel (actress), an American actress (1927-2008)
 Sandra Deel, one of the alternatives names used for the character Shriek